Javier Esparza Coronado (born August 11, 1953) is a Mexican retired Luchador, or professional wrestler, currently working as a match maker for Consejo Mundial de Lucha Libre (CMLL). Esparza is best known under the ring name Franco Columbo, a name he uses even after retiring from wrestling.

Professional wrestling career
Esparza was trained for his professional wrestling career by legendary Mexican wrestling trainer Diablo Velazco before making his debut in 1975 as "Franco Columbo". Due to Velazco's connections to Empresa Mexicana de Lucha Libre (EMLL), Mexico's largest and the world's oldest professional wrestling promotion, Columbo landed job with EMLL only a few years after making his debut. On November 1, 1980 Columbo defeated Américo Rocca to win the Mexican National Welterweight Championship, holding it for 92 days before El Supremo won it on February 1, 1981. Throughout the late 1980s and 1990s Columbo began working as a trainer for EMLL (later renamed Consejo Mundial de Lucha Libre; CMLL) helping improve young wrestlers under EMLL/CMLL contract. After retiring from active competition in the late 1990s, Columbo began being more involved in the booking aspects of CMLL, moving up the ranks to being second in charge along with Juan Manuel Mar. The two are currently responsible for planning CMLL's weekly shows in Arena Mexico and Arena Coliseo, CMLL's two most popular venues.

Championships and accomplishments
Empresa Mexicana de Lucha Libre
Mexican National Welterweight Championship (2 times)
Regional championships
Occidente Welterweight Championship (1 time)

Luchas de Apuestas record

References

1953 births
Mexican male professional wrestlers
Living people
Professional wrestlers from Jalisco
People from Guadalajara, Jalisco